Science and Christian Belief is a biannual peer-reviewed academic journal published by Christians in Science and the Victoria Institute. The editors-in-chief are Keith R Fox and Meric Srokosz.

The journal was established in 1989, with Oliver Barclay and A. Brian Robins as co-editors-in-chief. It is abstracted and indexed in New Testament Abstracts, Religion Index One: Periodicals, and Religious & Theological Abstracts, and is distributed by EBSCO Information Services as part of Academic Search and other collections. The journal is free to members of Christians in Science.

The Victoria Institute (also known as the Philosophical Society of Great Britain) published the Journal of the Transactions of The Victoria Institute, which was established in 1866; it was renamed Faith and Thought in 1958, and then merged with the (informal) CIS Bulletin in 1989, obtaining its current name, Faith and Thought.

References

External links
 
 Warren S. Brown and Malcolm A. Jeeves, "Portraits of Human Nature: Reconciling Neuroscience and Christian Anthropology," A report from a seminar at the combined meeting of the American Scientific Affiliation and Christians in Science, Churchill College, Cambridge University, August 1998, from Science and Christian Belief 11 No. 2 (October 1999): 139–50
 Russell, Colin, "Without a Memory", from Perspectives on Science and Christian Faith (American Scientific Affiliation), 45 (March 1993): 219–21, Reprinted with permission from Science & Christian Belief (1993) Vol 5. No 1
 Full text of Vol. 1

Religion and science
Christianity studies journals
Christian media
Publications established in 1988
Christianity and science
Biannual journals
English-language journals